Thomas Gee (1815–1898) was a Welsh Nonconformist preacher.

Thomas Gee may also refer to:
Thomas Gibbs Gee (1925–1994), United States Circuit Judge
Tom Gee (Thomas Henry Gee Jr., 1900–1984), African-American baseball catcher in the Negro leagues
Thomas Gee, name of the founder of Gwasg Gee publishing firm, and his more famous son who later took over the firm

See also
Thomas McGee (disambiguation)